Non evaporable getters (NEG), based on the principle of metallic surface sorption of gas molecules, are mostly porous alloys or powder mixtures of Al, Zr, Ti, V and Fe. They help to establish and maintain vacuums by soaking up or bonding to gas molecules that remain within a partial vacuum. This is done through the use of materials that readily form stable compounds with active gases. They are important tools for improving the performance of many vacuum systems. Sintered onto the inner surface of high vacuum vessels, the NEG coating can be applied even to spaces that are narrow and hard to pump out, which makes it very popular in particle accelerators where this is an issue. The main sorption parameters of the kind of NEGs, like pumping speed and sorption capacity, have low limits.

A different type of NEG, which is not coated, is the Tubegetter. The activation of these getters is accomplished mechanically or at a temperature from 550 K. The temperature range is from 0 to 800 K under HV/UHV conditions.

The NEG acts as a getter or getter pump that is able to reduce the pressure to less than 10−12 mbar.

References

Video: Non-Evaporable Getter (NEG) Operation
Folder: TubeGetter

See also
 Ion pump (physics)

Vacuum